Trouble Funk is an American R&B and funk band from Washington, D.C. The group helped to popularize funk and the subgenre go-go in the Washington metropolitan area. Among the band's well-known songs are the go-go anthem "Hey, Fellas". They released several studio albums including Drop the Bomb, In Times of Trouble, Live, and Trouble Over Here Trouble Over There (UK No. 54), and two live albums, Trouble Funk: Straight Up Go-Go Style and Saturday Night Live. In 1982, they released a single "So Early in the Morning" on D.E.T.T Records, later reissued on diverse labels as 2.13.61 and Tuff City. Trouble Funk sometimes shared the stage with hardcore punk bands of the day such as Minor Threat and the Big Boys.

Trouble Funk's song "Pump Me Up" was sampled by many other artists, including Dimples D.'s one-hit wonder "Sucker DJ", which went to No. 1 in Australia, Public Enemy's "Fight the Power", Kurtis Blow's song "If I Ruled the World" and M.A.R.R.S.'s song "Pump Up the Volume". The song is also featured in the film Style Wars and on the fictional old-school hip hop radio station Wildstyle in the game, Grand Theft Auto: Vice City.

Keyboard player Robert "Syke Dyke" Reed died at the age of 50 on April 13, 2008, from pancreatic cancer.

Trouble Funk remains active in the Washington, D.C. area live-music scene.

Discography 
Live (also titled as Straight Up Funk Go Go Style) (Jamtu Records, 1981)
Drop the Bomb (Sugar Hill, 1982)
In Times of Trouble (D.E.T.T. Records, 1983)
Saturday Night Live (Island Records, 1983)
Say What! (Island, 1986)
Trouble Over Here (Island, 1987)
Early Singles (Infinite Zero, 1997)
Droppin' Bombs (Harmless, 1998)
E Flat Boogie (Funky Delicacies, 2000)
The Complete Collection of Trouble Funk (TF Records, 2015)

References

External links 
 Official Trouble Funk website
 Trouble Funk discography at Discogs.com

Go-go musical groups
Musical groups from Washington, D.C.
Island Records artists
Musical groups established in 1978
1978 establishments in Washington, D.C.